Stonihurst is a historic estate located at Highland Falls in Orange County, New York. It was built about 1880 and is a two-story clapboard structure on a brick foundation with Gothic style details. Also on the property is a two-story board and batten barn, gatehouse, and gazebo.

It was listed on the National Register of Historic Places in 1982.

References

Houses on the National Register of Historic Places in New York (state)
Houses in Orange County, New York
National Register of Historic Places in Orange County, New York
Gothic Revival architecture in New York (state)
Houses completed in 1880
Highland Falls, New York